Allan Trautman (born May 25, 1955) is an American puppeteer, best known for his work with The Jim Henson Company.

Early life
He is originally from Brooklyn, New York. Trautman has a B.A. in Physics and Drama from Washington University in St. Louis.

Career
He had his first job as a puppeteer during college working on The Letter People. He also has an MFA in Acting from California Institute of the Arts. Trautman spent two summers performing at the Colorado Shakespeare Festival. He stayed in Los Angeles after graduation and performed with Sid and Marty Krofft. Trautman began working with the Muppets in 1990 on Muppet*Vision 3D, still showing in the Disney theme parks. He has been working with Jim Henson's Creature Shop since 1991 on animatronic projects as well as The Henson Digital Performance Studio. He is a cast member of Henson Alternative's puppet improv show, Puppet Up! (a.k.a. Stuffed and Unstrung), touring to such places as Melbourne and Sydney, Australia. He has also teaches Improvisation at College of the Canyons in Santa Clarita, California.

Filmography

Film
 The Return of the Living Dead (1985) - Tarman Zombie
 Return of the Living Dead Part II (1988) - Tarman Zombie
 Cold Dog Soup (1990) - Joseph
 Muppet Classic Theater (1994) - Banker, Father Pig
 Jack Frost (1998) - Puppeteer
 Muppets from Space (1999) - Additional Muppet Performer
 The Flintstones in Viva Rock Vegas (2000) - Juicer (voice, uncredited)
 Monkeybone (2001) - BBQ Pig (voice)
 It's a Very Merry Muppet Christmas Movie (2002, TV Movie) - Eugene, Performer of Joe Snow
 Intolerable Cruelty (2003) - Convention Lawyer
 Return of the Living Dead: Rave to the Grave (2005) - Tarman Zombie
 The Muppets' Wizard of Oz (2005, TV Movie) - Crow, Old Tom
 The Jungle Book (2016) - Animal Voices (voice)
 The Happytime Murders (2018) - Octopus, Puppet Doctor
 Muppets Haunted Mansion (2021) - Supporting Muppet Performer

Television
 The Letter People (1974-1976) - Mister C, Mister K, Mr. V (puppeteer)
 Dinosaurs - Fran Sinclair (face performer), Grandpa Louie (performer), Winston (performer), Georgie the Hippo (suit performer and normal voice), Bradley P. Richfield (suit performer, occasionally), Mr. Pulman, Dr. Elliot Piaget, Edward R. Hero, Moolah the Cash Cow, Mr. Lizard, Mr. Otto Lynch
 The Puzzle Place - Kyle O'Connor (Season 3 Puppetry only)
 Sid the Science Kid - Director  
 Unhappily Ever After - Mr. Floppy Puppeteer
 Puppet Up! on TBS
 Greg the Bunny
 Muppets Tonight - Fairyland Police Chief ("Fairyland PD" segments)
 The Adventures of Timmy the Tooth - Gil the Grouper, Johnny Paste, Sherry the Fairy, Sunny the Sun
 Splash and Bubbles - Bob

Web series
 Alt/Reality - Various
 Simian Undercover Detective Squad - Skreet the Orangutan
 Statler and Waldorf: From the Balcony - Deliveryman (ep. 17)

Other
 Puppet Up! - Performer
 Stuffed and Unstrung - Performer 
 Dr. Dolittle - Puppet Coordinator
 The Muppets Take the Bowl - Additional Muppet Performer (live show at the Hollywood Bowl, Sept. 8–10, 2017)
 The Muppets Take the O2'' - Additional Muppet Performer (live show at the O2 Arena, Jul. 13-14, 2018)

References

External links
 
 Trautman is the ‘puppet master’ at the Santa Clarita Valley Signal

1955 births
Living people
Sesame Street Muppeteers
American puppeteers
Washington University physicists